Sarawak People's Aspiration Party or (abbreviated ASPIRASI), is a political party based in Sarawak, Malaysia, renamed and rebranded from previously State Reform Party abbreviated STAR.

Background and history: State Reform Party (STAR)

The party began as the State Reform Party (STAR) in the 1990s founded by Patau Rubis, using a 9-pointed star derived from the state flag as its logo. The party contested in the 2016 state elections under the STAR logo, failing to win a single seat. 

The State Reform Party's policy will ensure the party always struggle as a significant pressure group on demanding recognition of Sarawak rights together with many other non-governmental organisations (NGOs). The Party demands that the Government of Sarawak have to reform the state government system and go out from the available comfort zone. As a pro-Sarawakian independence party, it aims to table Sarawak Independence Referendum Ordinance in event it won seat in the Sarawak State Legislative Assembly.

STAR leadership
Patau Rubis the first STAR president. He died in 2016, after collapsed while presiding the STAR's Annual General Meeting (AGM) on 20 March and was replaced by Lina Soo. Beside the President Lina Soo, the party AGM later had also elected a new committee including Bulin anak Ribos as Chairman on 12 October 2017.

STAR Sabah expansion and separation
In 2012, STAR also expanded to neighbouring Sabah with setting of the state chapter led by Jeffrey Kitingan, who had also initiated the United Borneo Alliance (UBA), in its effort to switch to a Borneo-based regional party uniting all local parties in Sabah and Sarawak to promote jointly the 7 Borneo Agendas.

In 2016 however Kitingan re-registered the Sabah chapter as a new Sabah-based party, Parti Solidariti Tanah Airku (STAR) but retained the backronym STAR, leaving the original State Reform Party back as Sarawak-based. The STAR Sabah and STAR Sarawak finally separated their ideology in 2016 (STAR Sabah for Sabah state and STAR Sarawak for Sarawak state with different leader each state). STAR Sabah rebranding their party as Homeland Solidarity Party abbreviated as STAR and STAR Sarawak rebranding their party as Sarawak People's Aspiration Party abbreviated as ASPIRASI.

Rebranding as ASPIRASI
The party rebranded as Parti Aspirasi Rakyat Sarawak or ASPIRASI in February 2020. Beside new party name, a new logo also being unveiled. The party chose the new logo designed based on Rajah Brooke birdwing butterfly (Trogonoptera brookiana). The official logo of ASPIRASI Party has been revealed on 13 December 2021, one week before 2021 Sarawak state election.

_

Leadership Line 

 Advisor:
 Chieng Lea Phing
 Chairman:
 Jane Anak Dripin
 President:
 Lina Soo
 Deputy President:
 Freedy Misin
 Vice President:
 Winston Way Dikod
 Adam Wong Sing Wei
 Dorus Katan Juman
 Alex Leong Shao Tung
 Ngelayang Unau
 Simon Jangan
 Jame Nyuking
 Thomas Kiew
 Latrick Jimie
 Head Of Advertising:
 Ana Osin
 Deputy Advertising:
 Then Liak Ding
 Leader Of Youth:
 Romeo Diyong
 Leader Of Woman:
 Josephine Lau Kiew Peng
 Secretary General:
 Andygie Gines
 Deputy Secretary General:
 Benjamin Lim Siew Ming
 Tresurer:
 Amanda Lee
 Deputy Tresurer:
 'Vacant Auditor Lamon Kambeng
 Francis Dorus
 Committee Member:'
 Rosli Lambeng
 Ronie Arthur
 Anthony Duri
 Christopher Alexis Sellie
 Jileng Kion
 Felix Ayeh
 Benedict Novil Ginong
 Lucas Chin Lu Chi
 Weenie Chua

List of presidents 
 Dr Patau Rubis (1996-2011) 
 Dr Dripin Sakoi (2011-2016) 
 Lina Soo (2016-present)

We wait ROS investigation as Lina Soo has launched a complaint to ROS.

Elected representatives

Candidates in the Sarawak state elections 
 State Reform Party candidates, 2016 Sarawak state election

General election results

State election results

References

External links 
 
 

Political parties in Sarawak
Political parties established in 1996
1996 establishments in Malaysia